"Stux (Tell Me It's Alright)" is the second single by Surrey-based rock band Reuben. It was recorded in June 2002 with the band's friend Rob Fisher at Opus Studios in Grayshott, and was released in August later that year in the Bossmusic label. Despite bad press reviews the single reached #86 is the UK charts, the highest-charting single for the band at the time. The promotional video enjoyed success in the MTV2 chart, eventually climbing to #1 in December of that year following the band's tour supporting Hell Is for Heroes.

Track listing
"Stux (Tell Me It’s Alright)"
"Stealing Is Easy"
"Banner Held High"

Personnel
Jamie Lenman – Guitars, vocals
Jon Pearce – Bass Guitar
Guy Davis – Drums (tracks 1 & 3)
Mark Lawton – Drums (track 2)

2002 singles
Reuben (band) songs
2002 songs
Songs written by Jamie Lenman